Tracy Henderson (born December 31, 1974) is a former professional basketball player. She played four seasons with University of Georgia, two seasons in the American Basketball League, and three seasons in the Women's National Basketball Association.

College
Henderson played for the Lady Bulldogs from 1993 to 1997. During that time, she helped lead them to two consecutive NCAA Final Four appearances. She also helped lead them to SEC championships during her final two years. In 1997, she was ranked in University of Georgia's top 10 all-time leaders in scoring, rebounding, field goal percentage, and blocks.

Georgia statistics
Source

WNBA
Henderson played a total of 61 games and 526 minutes. She missed the entire 2000 WNBA season due to pregnancy and the entire 2001 WNBA season due to knee rehabilitation. She retired in 2004.

Personal life
Henderson has three children with Robert Edwards.

Honors and awards
3x First-team All-SEC (1995–97)
2x honorable mention All-American

References

External links
Tracy Henderson '94: Patrick Henry's Top Women's Basketball Player
Tracy Henderson - Patrick Henry High School stats
All-Time WNBA Draft List|WNBA

Living people
1974 births
American women's basketball players
Atlanta Glory players
Basketball players from Minnesota
Centers (basketball)
Cleveland Rockers players
Georgia Lady Bulldogs basketball players
Nashville Noise players